Henhai ("Sea of Woe" or "Sea of Regret") is a 1906 novel in 10 chapters by Wu Jianren (Wu Woyao). Set in the turmoil surrounding the Boxer Uprising of 1900, the plot involves two couples, whose arranged marriages cannot be completed.  The husband-to-be of one couple dies from opium addiction, and his brother’s bride-to-be becomes a prostitute.

The novel was one of the best sellers of the decade and is taken to be a response to foreign-inspired attacks on traditional Chinese marriage.

Background 
Wu Jianren claimed that he dashed off his 1906 novel in ten days. It became one of the most famous novels of the period. Patrick Hanan explains that Sea of Regret was Wu’s response to Stones in the Sea, a novel published a few months earlier, under the pseudonym Fu Lin. Stones in the Sea is narrated by the hero of a tragic love affair to dramatize the conflict between the traditional Chinese system of arranged marriage and the wishes of the young people involved. The story emphasizes the rights of the young people rather than their responsibilities to their families. Wu Jianren felt that this seemed to emphasize sexual passion or even lechery rather than love of parents.

Michael Egan argues that the plot determines the character and therefore the characters are subordinate to the plot, rather than the character determining the plot, as the case is in traditional novels.

References
 Doar, Bruce. "The Chinese Novel at the Turn of the Century" (book review). The Australian Journal of Chinese Affairs, ISSN 0156-7365, 01/1982, Issue 7, pp. 199 - 201 (Available on JSTOR)
 
 Hegel, Robert E. "The Chinese Novel at the Turn of the Century" (book review). Chinese Literature: Essays, Articles, Reviews (CLEAR), ISSN 0161-9705, 07/1983, Volume 5, Issue 1/2, pp. 188 - 191 
 Yee, Cordell D. K. "The Chinese Novel at the Turn of the Century" (book review). Journal of Asian Studies, ISSN 0021-9118, 05/1982, Volume 41, Issue 3, p. 574

Notes

Further reading
 Egan, Michael. "Characterization in Sea of Woe" in: Doleželová-Velingerová, Milena (editor). The Chinese Novel at the Turn of the Century (Toronto: University of Toronto Press; January 1, 1980), 9780802054739.

20th-century Chinese novels
Novels by Wu Jianren